Dialabad (also Romanized as Dīālābād, Dayal Abad, Deyālābād, and Dīyālābād) is a village in Khorramabad Rural District, Esfarvarin District, Takestan County, Qazvin Province, Iran. At the 2006 census, its population was 2,460, in 625 families.

References 

Populated places in Takestan County